Aplus assimilis is a species of sea snail, a marine gastropod mollusc in the family Pisaniidae.

Description

Distribution
This marine species occurs in European waters.

References

 Gofas, S.; Le Renard, J.; Bouchet, P. (2001). Mollusca, in: Costello, M.J. et al. (Ed.) (2001). European register of marine species: a check-list of the marine species in Europe and a bibliography of guides to their identification. Collection Patrimoines Naturels, 50: pp. 180–213

External links
  Aissaoui C., Puillandre N., Bouchet P., Fassio G., Modica M.V. & Oliverio M. (2016). Cryptic diversity in Mediterranean gastropods of the genus Aplus (Neogastropoda: Buccinidae). Scientia Marina. 80(4): 521–533

Pisaniidae
Gastropods described in 1846